"(Everything I Do) I Do It for You" is a song by Canadian singer-songwriter Bryan Adams. Written by Adams, Michael Kamen, and Robert John "Mutt" Lange, the power ballad was the lead single for both the soundtrack album from the 1991 film Robin Hood: Prince of Thieves and Adams's sixth studio album, Waking Up the Neighbours (1991). The single was released on June 17, 1991.

The song was an enormous chart success internationally, reaching the number-one position on the music charts of at least nineteen countries, notable exceptions in the Western World being Italy (number three) and Spain (number four). It also topped the Europe-wide sales chart for eighteen continuous weeks. In the United States, it topped the Billboard Hot 100, which combines radio airplay and sales, for seven weeks, but stayed at number one for seventeen consecutive weeks on the sales-only chart. It went on to sell more than 15 million copies worldwide, making it Adams's most successful song, and one of the best-selling singles of all time. The song has been covered by hundreds of singers and artists around the world.

Background
The musicians on the original recording are Adams on lead vocals, backing vocals and rhythm guitar, Bill Payne (piano), Mickey Curry (drums), Larry Klein (bass), Keith Scott (lead guitar and backing vocals), Robbie King (organ), and Mutt Lange (synthesizers). The song was based on the film's love theme by Kamen, "Maid Marian". The song was written in London, UK at the studio Adams was working at in 1990, and he and Lange wrote it in 45 minutes, recording it the following March, and releasing it three months later. The song is performed in the key of C major.

Commercial performance
In the United Kingdom, "(Everything I Do) I Do It for You" had the longest unbroken run at number one, spending sixteen consecutive weeks at the top of the UK Singles Chart from July 7, 1991, to October 27 when it dropped to number four. It also topped the Europe-wide sales chart for eighteen continuous weeks, still an all-time record, and topped the European-wide radio airplay chart for ten weeks.

In the United States, the power ballad spent seven weeks at number one on the Billboard Hot 100, which combines radio airplay and sales, the longest running number one song since 1983, and seventeen consecutive weeks at number one on the sales-only chart, which at the time set the all-time record for consecutive weeks at one. Billboard ranked it as the number-one pop song for 1991. It also held the number one spot on the US Adult Contemporary Chart for eight consecutive weeks, the longest run atop that chart since 1979, and was the number one song of the year on that chart.

"(Everything I Do) I Do It for You" also spent nine weeks atop the singles chart in Adams's native Canada, eleven weeks atop the Australian Singles Chart, and twelve weeks atop the Sweden Singles Chart. In most of the countries which hit ascended to number one, it was the number one song for the year 1991, exceptions being Germany (number two), Austria (number two) and Switzerland (number three).

Music videos
The official music video for the song was directed by Julien Temple. It shows Adams and his band performing the song in a forest with a silk mill in the background, and Adams alone performing on a rocky beachside, intercut with scenes from Robin Hood: Prince of Thieves. The video was filmed in a forest with the derelict silk mill near Holford in the Quantock Hills and on a beach with geological cliff formations near Kilve, Somerset. A video was also commissioned for a live version of the song, directed by Andy Morahan.

Awards and accolades
Adams, Kamen, and Lange won a Grammy Award for Best Song Written Specifically for a Motion Picture or Television, and was nominated for the Grammy Award for Record of the Year at the Grammy Awards of 1992. It was also nominated for an Academy Award for Best Original Song, but lost to "Beauty and the Beast." As recently as July 2020, it placed at number 13 on YouTube's "Most Listened to Rock Countdown", a monthly tally of the most viewed and listened to songs of the rock genre, both in current release and from the past; this was the second highest song by Adams' after "Please Forgive Me" at number 10. The song was placed 18th in a survey of the favourite songs of British readers of the Guinness Book of Records.

Charts

Weekly charts

Year-end charts

Decade-end charts

All-time charts

Sales and certifications

Fatima Mansions version
The Irish band Fatima Mansions released a heavily altered cover of the song as part of an NME tribute album in aid of the charity, the Spastics Society. The single was a double A-side with the Manic Street Preachers' version of "Suicide Is Painless". The single entered the UK top ten in 1992, and reached number 12 in the Republic of Ireland. However, the Manic Street Preachers song received most of the UK radio airplay.

Brandy version

American singer Brandy rerecorded "(Everything I Do) I Do It for You" for the standard version of her second studio album, Never Say Never (1998). Producer David Foster reworked the arrangement of the original song, with Dean Parks playing the acoustic guitar.

In 1999, her cover version was released as the album's final single on a double A-side with "U Don't Know Me" on the Oceanic music market, where it reached the top 30 of New Zealand's RIANZ singles chart. That same year, she performed the song live at VH1 Divas Live '99 alongside Faith Hill.

Track listings
Australian CD single
 "(Everything I Do) I Do It for You" – 4:10
 "U Don't Know Me" – 4:29
 "Have You Ever?" (Soul Skank Remix) – 5:40

Credits and personnel
Credits are taken from Never Say Never liner notes.

 Composer – Bryan Adams, Michael Kamen, R.J. Lange
 Production – David Foster
 Acoustic guitar – Dean Parks
 Electric guitar – Michael Thompson
 Programming – Felipe Elgueta
 Mixing – Tom Bender
 Recording – Al Schmitt

Charts

See also
List of Hot Adult Contemporary number ones of 1991
List of European number-one airplay songs of the 1990s

References

1990s ballads
1991 singles
1991 songs
1999 singles
A&M Records singles
Atlantic Records singles
Billboard Hot 100 number-one singles
Brandy Norwood songs
Bryan Adams songs
Canadian soft rock songs
Cashbox number-one singles
Contemporary R&B ballads
Dutch Top 40 number-one singles
European Hot 100 Singles number-one singles
Grammy Award for Best Song Written for Visual Media
Irish Singles Chart number-one singles
Music videos directed by Andy Morahan
Music videos directed by Julien Temple
Number-one singles in Australia
Number-one singles in Austria
Number-one singles in Belgium
Number-one singles in Denmark
Number-one singles in Finland
Number-one singles in Germany
Number-one singles in Greece
Number-one singles in Norway
Number-one singles in Portugal
Number-one singles in Sweden
Number-one singles in Switzerland
Pop ballads
Depictions of Robin Hood in music
Rock ballads
RPM Top Singles number-one singles
SNEP Top Singles number-one singles
Song recordings produced by Robert John "Mutt" Lange
Songs written by Robert John "Mutt" Lange
Songs written by Michael Kamen
Songs written by Bryan Adams
Songs written for films
UK Singles Chart number-one singles